The Mangarayi, also written Mangarai, were an indigenous Australian people of the Northern Territory.

Language
Mangarayi is thought to be one of the Gunwingguan languages. Francesca Merlan published a grammar of the language in 1982, one that is notable also for the difficulty it presents for determining whether it is a tensed or non-tensed language. The linguist Margaret Sharpe was deterred from pursuing more intensive studies of Mangarayi by a station owner who grew annoyed with the presence of metropolitan anthropologists and linguists coming to study the indigenous people on his cattle run.

Country
The Mangarayi held sway over an estimated  of land on the middle and upper courses of Roper River as far as Mount Lindsay. Their traditional grounds took in east of Mataranka and Maranboy, Mount Emily, Elsey, and
Beswick. The north-eastern frontier lay around Mount Elsie.

History
Some Mangarayi were thought to have been implicated in the murder of a telegraph worker from Daly Waters that took place on 30 June 1875. A large party of police and vigilantes set out to exact a thorough revenge by slaughtering large numbers of the Mangarayi and people of other tribes along the length of the Roper River in August of that year.

Alternative names
 Mangarei, Manggarai
 Mungarai
 Mungerry
 Walooka (?)

Source:

Notes

Citations

Sources

Aboriginal peoples of the Northern Territory